Mylène Brodeur (born April 17, 1987) is a Canadian former figure skater who is best known for her pairs career with partner John Mattatall. They are the 2009 Canadian national bronze medalists and placed tenth at the 2009 World Championships.

Career 
As a single skater, Brodeur made her international debut at the 2004 Triglav Trophy, finishing 12th on the junior level. She placed fourth at the 2005–06 ISU Junior Grand Prix event in Slovakia.

In March 2006, Brodeur teamed up with John Mattatall to compete in pairs. She also continued to compete in singles. Brodeur/Mattatall made their international debut at the 2006 Nebelhorn Trophy, where they placed 4th. They were 9th at the 2007 Canadian Championships.

In the 2007-08 season, Brodeur/Mattatall won the 2007 Ondrej Nepela Memorial and placed 7th at the 2008 Canadian Championships. Their placement at the event earned them a trip to the 2008 Four Continents, where they placed 7th.

Brodeur/Mattatal qualified for the 2009 World Championships and placed tenth. They announced their competitive retirement on March 25, 2011.

Personal life 
Brodeur married Nicholas Young in June 2010.

Competitive highlights

Pair skating with Mattatall

Singles career

References

External links 

 
 
 

1987 births
Canadian female single skaters
Canadian female pair skaters
French Quebecers
Living people
People from Saint-Jean-sur-Richelieu
Sportspeople from Quebec